Capital punishment is a legal penalty in Lebanon, though no executions have been carried out since 2004.

Capital crimes in Lebanon include murder, espionage, treason, terrorism, collaborating with Israeli forces and if the crime is especially heinous enough, rape, pedophilia, gang-robbery or gang-assault, arson against certain types of structures or sabotage of communications, transportation or industrial facilities causing death, aggravated assault, gang-assault involving torture, life-eligible crimes with recidivism, importing nuclear/toxic wastes, polluting rivers or waterways with harmful substances and some military offences (e.g. desertion).

The methods prescribed by law are hanging and firing squad, although hanging has been the predominant method throughout Lebanese history. In the Lebanese Republic, the President has the sole authority to pardon an inmate and all execution orders must be ratified by him.

References

Lebanon
Law enforcement in Lebanon
Murder in Lebanon
Human rights abuses in Lebanon